Venedictoffia is a genus of moths in the subfamily Arctiinae. The genus was erected by Hervé de Toulgoët in 1977.

Species
Venedictoffia flavicollis Toulgoët, 1977
Venedictoffia karsholti (Toulgoët, 1991)

References

Arctiini
Moth genera